The Warburg coefficient (or Warburg constant; denoted  or ) is the diffusion coefficient of ions in solution, associated to the Warburg element, .  The Warburg coefficient has units of 

The value of  can be obtained by the gradient of the Warburg plot, a linear plot of the real impedance against the reciprocal of the square root of the frequency. This relation should always yield a straight line, as it is unique for a Warburg.

Alternatively, the value of  can be found by:

where 
 is the ideal gas constant;
 is the thermodynamic temperature;
 is the Faraday constant; 
 is the valency;
 is the diffusion coefficient of the species, where subscripts  and  stand for the oxidized and reduced species respectively;
 is the concentration of the electrolyte;
 denotes the surface area; 

The equation for  applies to both reversible and quasi-reversible reactions for which both halves of the couple are soluble.

References
 

Electrochemistry